The National Social Security Workers Union (Sindicato Nacional de Trabajadores del Seguro Social or SNTSS) is a Mexican labor union representing employees of the Mexican Social Security Institute (IMSS).

The  Leader of the SNTSS is Roberto Vega Galina.

Trade unions in Mexico
Civil service trade unions
Trade unions established in 1943